Queen's Arcade is a Grade B1 listed shopping arcade in the centre of Belfast, Northern Ireland. It runs from 29 to 33 Donegall Place to 32 Fountain Street.

History
The arcade and the building above it were designed by James McKinnon in 1880, for developer George Fisher.

In 1919 it was acquired by Frederick W. Henry, who operated the adjacent Carlton Cafe & Restaurant at 25-27 Donegall Place.

In the 1930s, Hobart & Heron Architects carried out alterations for then resident Austin Reed Ltd. The monogram "AR", in reference to the company, is still visible today on the third floor of the Donegall Place façade. The same architects carried out further works in 1937, following fire damage. The architectural firm still exists today as Hobart Heron.

During the 1980s and 1990s, the arcade was owned by Prudential Portfolio Managers Ltd. In 1987 they refurbished the building façades and installed canopies over the Donegall Place and Fountain Street entrances. They carried out further refurbishment works during 1994.

The building gained Grade B1 listed status in June 1993.

In August 2002, John H. Lunn (Jewellers) Ltd acquired Queen's Arcade and the adjacent building at 25-27 Donegall Place. The company had been started in the arcade nearly 50 years beforehand.

Gallery

See also

 Architecture of Belfast
 North Street Arcade

References

External links

 Official web site
 Queen's Arcade on Future Belfast

Grade B1 listed buildings
Buildings and structures in Belfast
Buildings and structures completed in 1880
Shopping centres in Northern Ireland
19th-century architecture in Northern Ireland